Quadyuk Island is an uninhabited island within the Arctic Archipelago in the Kitikmeot Region, Nunavut. It is located in Bathurst Inlet. Other islands in the vicinity include North Quadyuk Island, Rideout Island, and Wignick Island.

References 

Islands of Bathurst Inlet
Uninhabited islands of Kitikmeot Region